Parthasarathi Bhattacharjee (born 27 August 1986) is an Indian cricketer. He plays first-class cricket for Bengal.

See also
 List of Bengal cricketers

References

External links
 

1986 births
Living people
Indian cricketers
Bengal cricketers
People from Hooghly district